Dong Chang may refer to:

 Dong Chang (warlord) (董昌) (died 896), warlord who became a short-lived emperor in modern Zhejiang
 Eastern Depot or Dong Chang (東廠), Ming dynasty spy agency

See also
 Dongchang District